Lleyton Hewitt was the defending champion but did not compete that year.

Vince Spadea won in the final 7–5, 6–7(5–7), 6–3 against Nicolas Kiefer.

Seeds

  Andy Roddick (semifinals)
  Martin Verkerk (quarterfinals)
  Robby Ginepri (quarterfinals)
  Vince Spadea (champion)
  Taylor Dent (withdrew because of an illness)
  James Blake (quarterfinals)
  Nicolas Kiefer (final)
  Wayne Ferreira (first round)

Draw

Finals

Top half

Bottom half

External links
 Main draw

2004
2004 ATP Tour
2004 Tennis Channel Open